Long Live Ghosts! is a 1977 Czechoslovak children's film directed by Oldřich Lipský.

Cast 
 Dana Vávrová - Leontýnka Brtník of Brtník
 Jiří Sovák - the knight Brtník of Brtník
 Vlastimil Brodský - Vávra, school principal
 Lubomír Lipský - Antonín Jouza, supermarket manager

References

External links 

1970s children's comedy films
Czechoslovak comedy films
Films directed by Oldřich Lipský
1977 comedy films
1977 films
1970s Czech-language films